The 1941 Presbyterian Blue Hose football team was an American football team that represented Presbyterian College as a member of the Southern Intercollegiate Athletic Association (SIAA) during the 1941 college football season. Led by head coach Lonnie McMillian, the team compiled a 6–3 record (5–0 against SIAA opponents) and won the SIAA championship. Verne Church and Lloyd Evans were the team captains. The team played its home games at Old Bailey Stadium in Clinton, South Carolina.

Schedule

References

Presbyterian
Presbyterian Blue Hose football seasons
Presbyterian Blue Hose football